Alexandru Deaconu (born 3 March 1972) is a Romanian former professional football referee. His Liga I debut was a match between Astra Ploiești and FC Universitatea Craiova on 11 September 2000. He has been a full international for FIFA since 2005 and his first international match was between Khazar Lankaran and Nistru Otaci on 2005–06 UEFA Cup qualifying rounds.

References

External links 
 
 

1972 births
Living people
Romanian football referees